Martinho de Araújo, born 26 July 1973 in Dili, is an East Timorese weightlifter. He was one of the first sportspeople to represent East Timor at the Olympic Games, when he took part in weightlifting events at the 2000 Summer Olympics in Sydney.

A resident of Dili, he fled his home in 1999 after East Timor's declaration of independence from Indonesia, and the ensuing violence. He subsequently returned to find that his weightlifting training equipment had been stolen or rendered unusable in looting and arson. In order to continue training, de Araújo "improvised with metal rods stuck into paint cans that had been filled with cement."

In Sydney, he lifted 67.5 kg in the snatch and 90 kg in the clean and jerk, finishing last. Newsday commented: "He wasn't exactly crushed by it. Chances are none of the other competitors had to make their own weights and barbells to train."

References

External links
 

1973 births
Living people
Weightlifters at the 2000 Summer Olympics
Olympic weightlifters of East Timor
People from Dili
Weightlifters at the 2002 Asian Games
East Timorese male weightlifters
Asian Games competitors for East Timor